HBU may refer to:

Universities 
 Hebei University, in China
 Hong Bang University. in Ho Chi Minh City, Vietnam
 Houston Baptist University, former name of the institution in Texas, United States now known as Houston Christian University

Other uses 
 Bulgan Airport, Khovd, in Mongolia 
 Habun language, spoken in East Timor
 Hawke's Bay United FC, a New Zealand football club
 Herne Bay United, an English roller hockey club
 Highest and best use
 Hollandsche Bank-Unie, a defunct Dutch bank